Marripadu may refer to:

 Marripadu, Chittoor district village
 Marripadu, Nellore district village